Southwick (Dumfries & Galloway) railway station served the civil parish of Colvend and Southwick, Dumfries and Galloway, Scotland from 1859 to 1965 on the Castle Douglas and Dumfries Railway.

History 
The station opened on 7 November 1859 by the Glasgow and South Western Railway. To the west was a  signal box, which opened in 1878, and a siding were to the west. In 1940, ICI Nobel opened a factory at Southwick Ammunition Factory which was served by two sets of sidings in the west: Southwick Factory Siding and Maidenholm Sidings. The signal box closed in 1961 and the station closed on 3 May 1965.

References

External links 
RAILSCOT - Southwick

Disused railway stations in Dumfries and Galloway
Railway stations in Great Britain opened in 1859
Railway stations in Great Britain closed in 1965
Beeching closures in Scotland
Former Glasgow and South Western Railway stations
1859 establishments in Scotland
1965 disestablishments in Scotland